Xianzhi (Old Chinese: 鮮支 (xiānzhī)), is one of the Xiongnu tribes.

Etymology 
Xianzhi means Gardenia in Chinese.

History 
It is one of the 19 Hun tribes counted by the Jin book. There is restricted information about the Xianzhi (鮮支) tribe. According to the book of Jin, in the spring of the 13th year, Liang ruler Li Shiye defeated Juqu Mengxun in the Xianzhi creek. Dai the Elder's ritual records state that the Xianzhi (鮮支), the Qosuo, the Di, and the Qiang were pacified by Emperor Shun in the West. And the same sentence is cited as the pacified tribes in Shiji, "the Western Rong, the Xizhi (析枝), the Qusou, the Di, and the Qiang". Based on this, it is possible to say that it is mentioned as Xianzhi in the Jin book and the Book of Rites, but as Xizhi in Shiji.

References 

Ancient peoples of China